Gascon campaign may refer to several military conflicts between English and French forces:

 Gascon campaign (1294–1303)
 Gascon campaign of 1345
 Gascon campaign of 1442
 Gascon campaign of 1450–1453